14-Norpseurotin A is an alkaloid and a bio-active metabolite of Aspergillus, featuring an oxa-spiro-lactam core.

See also
Pseurotin A

References 

Aspergillus
Spiro compounds